Catajapyx singularis is a species of forcepstail in the family Japygidae.

References

Diplura
Articles created by Qbugbot
Animals described in 1983